Notodryas encrita is a moth in the family Epermeniidae. It was described by Oswald Bertram Lower in 1920. It is found in Australia, where it has been recorded from South Australia and Victoria.

The wingspan is about 10 mm. The forewings are white, faintly tinged with ochreous and with ochreous-fuscous markings. The hindwings are pale fuscous.

References

Moths described in 1920
Epermeniidae
Moths of Australia